Vasile Şoimaru (born 30 April 1949) is a Moldovan politician, economist, professor and photographer.

Biography

Professional career
An economist by training, Șoimaru worked between 1977-1980 at the Faculty of Economics of the State University of Moldova: Lecturer, Senior lecturer, University lecturer (since 1982), prodecan. In 1991-1994 he was Vice rector of the newly founded Academy of Economic studies of Moldova (ASEM).

Political career
He served as member of the Parliament of Moldova between 1990-1994, 1998-2001. In 2021 he was again elected as deputy from the Party of Action and Solidarity, without being a party member.

References

External links 
 Cine au fost şi ce fac deputaţii primului Parlament din R. Moldova (1990-1994)? 
 Declaraţia deputaţilor din primul Parlament 
 Site-ul Parlamentului Republicii Moldova

1949 births
Living people
20th-century Romanian photographers
21st-century Romanian photographers
Moldovan economists
Moldovan MPs 1990–1994
Popular Front of Moldova MPs
Recipients of the Order of Honour (Moldova)
Romanian people of Moldovan descent
Romanian photographers